James Duffy may refer to:

Sportsmen 
 James E. Duffy (American football) (1867–1953), American football player and lawyer
 Jimmy Duffy (1890–1915), winner of the 1914 Boston Marathon
 Jim Duffy (rugby league) (active 1915–1920), rugby league footballer
 James F. Duffy (1892–1961), American football coach
 Jim Duffy (umpire) (1920–2003), American baseball umpire
 Jim Duffy (footballer) (born 1959), former manager of Greenock Morton F.C. and Hibernian F.C. 
 Jim Duffy (baseball coach) (born 1974), American college baseball coach
 Jamie Duffy (born 1983), Irish footballer in 2007 FAI Cup, 2008 Dundalk F.C. season and 2008 Dundalk F.C. season
 James Duffy (cricketer), English cricketer in MCC University matches in 2005

Others 
 James E. Duffy Jr. (born 1942), retired associate justice of the Hawaii State Supreme Court
 James Duffy (Irish publisher) (1809–1871), Irish publisher of Nationalist and Roman Catholic books, bibles and religious texts
 James Duffy (VC) (1889–1969), Irish recipient of the Victoria Cross
 James Duffy, a character in the short story "A Painful Case" (part of the book Dubliners) by James Joyce
 James Albert Duffy (died 1968), first bishop for the Diocese of Grand Island
 James P.B. Duffy (1878–1969), former U.S. Congressman from New York
 Jim Duffy (journalist) (born 1966), Irish historian and political commentator
 Jim Duffy (animator) (1937–2012), American animator
 Jim Duffey (born 1950), former Virginia Secretary of Technology